"This Is Me" is a song written by Tom Shapiro and Thom McHugh, and recorded by American country music artist Randy Travis.  It was released in October 1994 as the third single and title track from his album, This Is Me.  The song reached number 5 on the Billboard Hot Country Singles & Tracks chart in December 1994.

Music video
The music video was directed by Gerry Wenner and premiered in late 1994.

Chart performance
"This Is Me" debuted at number 49 on the U.S. Billboard Hot Country Singles & Tracks for the week of October 22, 1994.

Year-end charts

References

1994 singles
Randy Travis songs
Songs written by Tom Shapiro
Song recordings produced by Kyle Lehning
Warner Records singles
1994 songs
Songs written by Thom McHugh